Mile Savković (born 3 November 1992) is a Serbian football midfielder who plays for FK Mladost Novi Sad.

External links
 
 Mile Savković stats at utakmica.rs 
 
 

1992 births
Living people
Sportspeople from Zrenjanin
Serbian footballers
Association football midfielders
FK BSK Borča players
FK Jagodina players
FK Spartak Subotica players
Jagiellonia Białystok players
Serbian First League players
Serbian SuperLiga players
Ekstraklasa players
Serbian expatriate footballers
Expatriate footballers in Poland
Serbian expatriate sportspeople in Poland